Fight for Your Life is a 1977 American grindhouse blaxploitation thriller film directed by Robert A. Endelson and starring William Sanderson and Robert Judd. It was presented at the Quentin Tarantino Film Festival in the QT Six Lineup showing held in October 2005. The story revolves around three criminals (a White, Mexican, and Asian male) who hold a Black family hostage and forces them to fight for their lives.

Plot 
Sanderson plays Kane, a hate-fuelled racist redneck who absconds from jail with his sidekicks (an Asian and a Mexican). They hole up in the secluded house of Ted Turner, a black minister, and his family, where harsh epithets are exchanged and the minister is forced to take action to defend his family.

Cast 
 William Sanderson – as Jessie Lee Kane
 Robert Judd – as Ted Turner
 Cathrine Peppers – as Mrs. Turner
 Lela Small – as Grandma Turner
 Yvonne Ross – as Corrie Turner
 Reggie Rock Bythewood – as Floyd Turner (as Reginald Bythewood)
 Ramon Saunders – as Val Turner
 Queenie Endelson – as Dog
 Daniel Faraldo – Chino
 Peter Yoshida – Ling
 Bonnie Martin – Karen
 David Cargill – Lt. Reilly
 Richard A. Rubin – Captain Hamilton
 David Dewlow – Joey
 Pepe Hern – Navarro
Nick Hardin- Tony

Reception 
Fight for Your Life has received a negative response from critics. TV Guide called it "a vile low-budget film that couldn't have found a receptive audience even during the height of tough blaxploitation pictures." Allmovie called it an "outrageous sleazefest" and "amazingly racist". Others have defended the film, finding it an objective look at racism at its worst; the film enjoys a cult following among fans of extreme cinema and grindhouse.

Censorship 
Fight For Your Life was denied a British theatrical release in 1981, but a video release the following year allowed the public brief access to the film before it wound up on the video nasties list and was outlawed.  It is notable for being the only 'video nasty' to appear on the list due to language, specifically the racism displayed by Sanderson's character.

Availability 
Briefly available in the United Kingdom on the independent video label Vision On, released circa 1982, but outlawed with the advent of the Video Recordings Act (1984), Fight For Your Life was denied a British cinema release when it was rejected by the BBFC in October 1981. Fight For Your Life was issued in the U.S. by Blue Underground as a remastered DVD. The director passed on providing a commentary track for the DVD reissue, but did grant an interview for the book Nightmare USA in which he re-watched the film with his maid, Dorothy, and both provided retrospective insights on the film.

The original film negative, having been stored by the film rights holder in a New Jersey basement, was destroyed by Hurricane Sandy in 2012.

See also 
 List of films featuring home invasions

References

External links 
 

1977 films
1970s crime thriller films
American exploitation films
Home invasions in film
Films about race and ethnicity
American rape and revenge films
Video nasties
1970s English-language films
1970s American films